Itaguaçu is a municipality located in the Brazilian state of Espírito Santo. Itaguaçu has a population density of 26.6 per square kilometer. Itaguaçu has three districts: Itaimbé, Palmeira and Itaçu.

Origin of name

The name of the municipality is of Tupi origin: ita, meaning "rock", and guaçu, meaning "large".

Geography

Several waterfalls dot the town, notably the Cachoeira do Christófari. Itaguaçu borders the municipalities of Baixo Guandu to the northeast, Colatina to the north, São Roque do Canaã to the east, Itarana to the south, Laranja da Terra to the southeast, and Santa Teresa to the southeast.

History

Itaguaçu was first colonized in the second half of the 14th century by Francisco da Silva Coutinho, Antônio Gonçalves Ferreira, Major José Vieira de Carvalho and José Teodoro de Andrade. The first settlement was on the Santa Joana River, and also called Santa Joana. It was later known as Boa Família and finally as Itaguaçu.

A later wave of settlement came with the Italian immigration to Brazil of the late 19th century. Several families from San Cassiano de Treviso in the Italian province of Treviso. They worked for another native of Treviso in Santa Catarina for three years before twelve families moved to Boa Família in 1882.

Noted places

The Church of Matriz Nossa Senhora Medianeira de todas as Graças was built in the seat of the municipality in 1953. The Lutheran Church of Palmeira de Santa Joana (Templo de Palmeira de Santa Joana), located in the Palmeira district, was built in 1902. It is built in a style typical of Lutheran churches in the region with one tower and three bells.

References

Municipalities in Espírito Santo